Henry XIII (19 November 1235 – 3 February 1290 in Burghausen), member of the Wittelsbach dynasty, was Duke of Lower Bavaria.

Family 
He was the younger son of Otto II and Agnes of Brunswick.

Biography 
In 1254, he succeeded his father together with his brother Louis II in Bavaria and the Palatinate.
The brothers divided their land in 1255 against the law. Henry received Lower Bavaria and Louis Upper Bavaria and the Palatinate. It was the first of many divisions of the duchy. Henry resided in Landshut and, in 1255, the work for the main castle of Burghausen Castle was begun.

As the division of the duchy was against the law, it caused anger of the Bishops in Bavaria who allied with Ottokar II of Bohemia in 1257. In August 1257, Ottokar invaded Bavaria, but Henry and Louis managed to repulse the attack. It was one of the rare concerted and harmonious actions of both brothers who often argued. Henry was also later several times at war against the Archbishopric of Salzburg and the Bishop of Passau. During the conflict of King Rudolph I of Germany with Ottokar II, Duke Henry repeatedly changed allegiance.

During Duke Henry's reign, the Bavarian Peace Ordinances were put into place in his domains, stating, "Anyone out of doors at night without a lantern is violating the peace and is suspect of crime." The ordinances extend further for the city of Landshut that anyone carrying a sword or dagger by day or night was liable to heavy penalties.

Henry XIII was succeeded by his oldest son Otto III, who also became King of Hungary. Henry's branch died out in 1340 and was inherited by Louis' son Emperor Louis IV.

Marriage and children 
In 1250, Henry married Elizabeth of Hungary. She was a daughter of Béla IV of Hungary and Maria Laskarina. The couple were married for twenty-one years and had ten children:
 Agnes (January 1254 – 20 October 1315). Joined the Cistercian Monastery at Seligenthal as a nun. 
 Agnes (17 July 1255 – 10 May 1260). She shared her name with her older sister. 
 Agnes (29 October 1256 – 16 November 1260). She shared her name with her two older sisters.
 Elizabeth (23 April 1258 – 8 August 1314). Joined the Cistercian Monastery at Seligenthal as a nun.
 Otto III, Duke of Bavaria (11 February 1261 – 9 November 1312). 
 Henry (23 February 1262 – 16 September 1280). 
 Sophie (c. 1264 – 4 February 1282). Married Poppo VIII, Count of Henneberg.
 Catherine (9 June 1267 – 9 January 1310). Married Frederick Tuta, Margrave of Meissen. 
 Louis III, Duke of Bavaria (9 October 1269 – 9 October 1296). 
 Stephen I, Duke of Bavaria (14 March 1271 – 10 December 1310).

References

External links 
 
 
 

1235 births
1290 deaths
13th-century dukes of Bavaria
House of Wittelsbach